Small nuclear ribonucleoprotein-associated proteins B and B' is a protein that in humans is encoded by the SNRPB gene.

Function 

The protein encoded by this gene is one of several nuclear proteins that are found in common among U1, U2, U4/U6, and U5 small ribonucleoprotein particles (snRNPs). These snRNPs are involved in pre-mRNA splicing, and the encoded protein may also play a role in pre-mRNA splicing or snRNP structure. Autoantibodies from patients with systemic lupus erythematosus frequently recognize epitopes on the encoded protein. Two transcript variants encoding different isoforms (B and B') have been found for this gene.

Interactions 

SNRPB has been shown to interact with DDX20 and Coilin.

References

Further reading